Coimbatore is a city in the state of Tamil Nadu, India. Most transportation in the city and suburbs is over its road network. Coimbatore is  well connected to most cities and towns in India by road, rail, and air, but not through waterways. The city has successful transport infrastructure compared to other Indian cities, though road infrastructures are not well maintained and developed according to the growing needs of transport, making traffic congestion a major problem in the city. A comprehensive transport development plan has been made to address many traffic problems.

Roads 

The Coimbatore city and metropolitan area is divided into five administrative zones (East, West, North, South and Central) which are served by major arterial roads that run in an east–west or north–south direction. Avinashi Road is one of the city's most important arterial roads, traversing most of Central and East Coimbatore. It is part of National Highway 544, which connects to Bangalore, Chennai. 
Other arterials include Trichy Road (Central–southeast), Mettupalayam Road (North–South), Sathy Road (South–northeast), Palakkad Road (East–West), Pollachi Road (North–South), and Thadagam Road (East–West).
Maruthamalai Road starts at the intersection of Lawley Road Junction and connects to the neighbourhood of Vadavalli and the Maruthamalai foothills. Other roads include 100 feet road, Bharatiyar Road, Dr. Nanjappa Road, Balasundarum Road, Crosscut Road (in the Gandhipuram commercial district), Diwhan Bahadhur Road (DB Road), TV Swamy Road, Brooke Bond Road in RS Puram Areas, and Race Course Road.
In January 2012, the Coimbatore Corporation announced that they would be laying around 10 roads by mixing plastic.

National Highways
Five major National Highways radiate outward from Coimbatore:
NH 544 (Salem–Kochi road)
NH 81 (new NH code for Trichy Road) towards Karur, Tichy, Thanjavur and Nagapattinam.
NH 181 (Mettupalayam Road) towards Ooty and Gudalur leading to Karnataka and Kerala.
NH 948 (Sathy Road) towards Sathyamangalam, Chamrajnagar, Mysore and Bangalore.
NH 83 (Pollachi Road) towards Palani, Oddanchatram, Dindigul, Trichy, Tanjore and Nagapattinam.

Ring roads 

A major bypass was built by L&T from Neelambur to Madukkarai on NH 47 which intersects the Trichy Road at Chintamani Pudur near Irugur and Eachanari in Pollachi Road.

The Coimbatore Corporation is undertaking the construction of six railway overpass bridges in the city.

The National Highways Authority of India has invited feasibility studies to upgrade the National Highway connecting Pollachi and Bannari passing through the city.

Public transport

Most of Coimbatore's intra-city transport requirements are met by extensive public transport, with about 1257 buses on 322 routes. This service, which is run by the government-owned TNSTC Coimbatore covers the city and its suburbs. An additional 500 buses operate on 119 inter-city routes, to major towns in Tamil Nadu, Kerala, Karnataka, Pondicherry, and Andhra Pradesh. Bus services are generally considered efficient, but buses on some routes can get very crowded at times.

Private transport

The city is also served by a large number of private buses and auto rickshaws. The growth of call taxis is also on the rise and fixed-rate tourist taxis are available at the airport, bus terminals, and railway stations. Vans which are run like bus services are popularly called "maxi cabs". The outlying suburban areas of the city are served by private minibus company services and public buses of neighboring districts.

The city has a very high vehicle-to-population ratio. Despite a sharp increase in the number of four-wheelers in the city, motorscooters are still very prevalent, due to their affordability, fuel efficiency, maneuverability, and ease of parking.

List of Intercity (Mofussil, Omni, SECTC, Town) bus stands
Gandhipuram Central Bus Terminus
Gandhipuram Thiruvalluvar bus stand (For SETC(TNSTC) and KSRTC Buses)
Coimbatore Omni Bus Terminus(Near G.P. Signal)
Singanallur Bus Terminus
Saibaba Colony Bus Terminus (Near Saibaba Temple)
Ukkadam Bus Terminus (Ukkadam)
Coimbatore Integrated Bus Terminus (under construction)

List of Intracity bus stands
Gandhipuram Town Bus stand
Vadavalli Bus Terminus
Vellalore Bus Terminus
Singanallur Bus Stand
Ondipudur Bus Terminus
Marudhamalai bus Terminus
Ukkadam Bus stand
SaiBaba colony bus stand

List of TNSTC Coimbatore depots

 Head-Office Branch (City & Moffusil)
 Upppilipalayam (Moffusil only)
 Sungam-1 (City & Moffusil)
 Sungam-2 (City only)
 Ukkadam-1 (City & Moffusil)
 Ukkadam-2 (City & Moffusil)
 Ondipudhur-1 (City only)
 Ondipudhur-2 (Moffusil only)
 Ondipudur-3 ( City & Moffusil)
 Marudhamalai (City only)
Vilangkurichi-Cheran Managar (City Only)
Karumathampati (City only)

Air 

Coimbatore International Airport  is a major airport serving Coimbatore and its suburbs. It is the second busiest airport in Tamil Nadu (after Chennai) and has separate domestic and international terminals.

Other airports in the metropolitan area include Sulur Air Force Station.

Railways 

Coimbatore Junction, also known as Kovai Junction, is the primary railway station serving the city, as well as the major rail junction of South India. It has six platforms and is the second busiest railway station in Tamil Nadu (after Chennai). Many trains from Kerala to other parts of the country pass through Coimbatore Junction. It is one of the top booking stations and revenue-generating stations in India according to Indian Railway.

Proposed rapid transit

Metro

Coimbatore Metro, also known as Kovai Metro or CMRL, is a proposed metro rail system. The plan was shelved in 2011 in favor of a monorail system. In January 2017, a Coimbatore District Administration official told The Hindu that there was no mass rapid transit system presently under consideration for the city. The government again announced a plan to construct metro rail in 2017. Railway Minister Suresh Prabu announced a metro rail facility for Coimbatore, and mentioned that the central government is ready to implement metro rail in Coimbatore. The state government has also approved metro rail. The proposed works were anticipated to begin by fiscal year 2017–18. The government announced that DPR for Coimbatore metro rail will be prepared by CMRL and it will be funded by a German-based company. The feasibility report has been submitted by Systra to CMRL and sent for government approval. DPR to be prepared after Approval of Feasibility study.

Suburban railway

Coimbatore railways have unique infrastructure to host a circular rail system as it has similar bus services within the city limits. One proposal would link Coimbatore, Coimbatore North, Peelamedu, Irugur, and Podanur before returning to Coimbatore junction. The other junctions are located at Coimbatore North Junction (2.6 km away from CBE on the northern side), Podanur Junction (5.8 km away from CBE on the southern side) and Irugur (16 km from CBE on eastern side).

Bus rapid transit

The Coimbatore BRTS (bus rapid transit system) was proposed under the JNNURM scheme. The project calls for a  corridor starting at Avinashi Road and ending at Mettupalayam Road. After Avinashi Road, the route turns left from Stanes School and passes along Dr. Nanjappa Road and joins at Dr. Rajendra Prasad Road. Avinashi Road, Dr. Rajendra Prasad Road, and Mettupalyam Road would have an exclusive lane reserved for buses.

A dedicated two-lane  carriageway is provided for the BRTS corridor. A dual lane for mixed traffic is provided on either side of the BRTS corridor, separated by  CC blocks on both sides. A  cycle track and 2-metre footpath is proposed on either side of the mixed traffic lane, also separated by CC blocks. It is proposed to have 14 at-grade bus stops and 3 bus stops in the route's  elevated section.

See also 
 Coimbatore Bus Rapid Transit System
 Coimbatore Bypass
 Coimbatore International Airport
 Coimbatore Junction
 Coimbatore North Junction
 Transport in Chennai
 Transport in India
 Coimbatore Metro

References

 
Coimbatore